Events in the year 1788 in India.

Events
National income - ₹10,101 million
 Trial of Warren Hastings, Governor-General of India, before the House of Lords, 12 Feb. 1788 – 23 Apr. 1795.

References

 
India
Years of the 18th century in India